The Church of Our Lady of Grace is a Roman Catholic church built between 1874 and 1876.  It is situated in Hoboken, Hudson County, New Jersey, United States. It is a Gothic-style church designed by Francis G. Himpler and William J. Whyte. Located on the corner of Fourth St. and Willow St. in Hoboken, it was listed on the National Register of Historic Places in 1996.

The exterior of the church was used for scenes in the 1954 film On the Waterfront.

See also
National Register of Historic Places listings in Hudson County, New Jersey

References

External links

Church website
Francis G. Himpler, architect

Our Lady of Grace
Churches on the National Register of Historic Places in New Jersey
Gothic Revival church buildings in New Jersey
Churches in Hudson County, New Jersey
19th-century Roman Catholic church buildings in the United States
Roman Catholic churches completed in 1876
National Register of Historic Places in Hudson County, New Jersey
New Jersey Register of Historic Places
Churches in Hoboken, New Jersey